Svein Bjørn Olsen (30 June 1945 – 18 July 1998) was a Norwegian football goalkeeper.

Olsen played for three top-tier clubs Sandefjord, Lyn and Sarpsborg, becoming league champion in 1968 and cup champion in 1967 and 1968. He represented Norway as an under-21 and senior international.

References

1945 births
1998 deaths
People from Sandefjord
Norwegian footballers
Sandefjord BK players
Lyn Fotball players
Sarpsborg FK players
Norway under-21 international footballers
Norway international footballers
Association football goalkeepers
Sportspeople from Vestfold og Telemark